George Dummer (1782 - February 22, 1853) was the founder of the Jersey Glass Company in Paulus Hook, New Jersey. He served as chairman of the board of trustees of Paulus Hook and then as the president of the board of selectmen from 1826 to 1831.

Biography
He was born in 1782 in New Haven, Connecticut. He later worked as a glass cutter in Albany, New York. He died on February 22, 1853.

References

1782 births
1853 deaths
Businesspeople from New Haven, Connecticut
Businesspeople from Jersey City, New Jersey
19th-century American businesspeople